Buddleja alternifolia, known as alternate-leaved butterfly-bush, is a species of flowering plant in the figwort family, which is endemic to Gansu, China.

Description

The leaves are alternate, entire, and lanceolate, 4–10 cm long by 0.6–1 cm wide, glabrous and dark green above. The inflorescences of the plants in cultivation are bright lilac-purple, and comprise flowers so densely crowded in clusters along the branch as to often obscure it. However, specimens from the Tsangpo valley in Tibet originally named B. tsetangensis by Marquand have creamy flowers. Flowering occurs in early summer; the flowers are fragrant, but less so than other buddlejas. 2n = 38.

Taxonomy
In his 1979 revision of the taxonomy of the African and Asiatic species of Buddleja, the Dutch botanist Anthonius Leeuwenberg sank two species, B. legendrei and B. tsetangensis, as B. alternifolia on the basis of the similarity in the individual flowers, dismissing the variations in plant structure, flower colour  and leaf as attributable to environmental factors. It was Leeuwenberg's taxonomy which was adopted in the Flora of China published in 1996. Until DNA analysis can prove otherwise, it is this classification which is accepted here.

Cultivation
In the West this plant was first described and named by the Russian botanist Carl Maximowicz in 1880. It was not introduced to cultivation in the West until 1915, by Purdom and Farrer.

The species has become very common in cultivation, a popular shrub for the larger garden, and is readily available from most garden centres in the UK. Fully hardy, it prefers a sunny position and loamy soil; pruning should immediately follow flowering. Like most buddlejas, the species is easily propagated from cuttings. Hardiness: RHS H5, USDA zones 7 – 9.

B. alternifolia was accorded the Royal Horticultural Society's Award of Garden Merit (record 674) in 1993.

Cultivars
 Buddleja alternifolia ‘Argentea’.

References

Hillier & Sons. (1977). Hilliers' Manual of Trees and Shrubs. David & Charles, Newton Abbot, UK

alternifolia
Flora of China
Taxa named by Karl Maximovich